Measure for Measure is a play written by William Shakespeare.

Measure for Measure may also refer to:

Measure for Measure (album), a 1986 studio album by Australian rock/synthpop band Icehouse 
Measure for Measure (1943 film), an Italian historical drama film directed by Marco Elter
Measure for Measure (2020 film), an Australian drama film
Measure for Measure, a 1979 BBC Television Shakespeare production